Center Valley is an unincorporated community in Clay Township, Morgan County, in the U.S. state of Indiana.

History
A post office was established at Center Valley in 1856, and remained in operation until it was discontinued in 1872.

Geography

References

Unincorporated communities in Morgan County, Indiana
Unincorporated communities in Indiana